Messier 52 or M52, also known as NGC 7654, is an open cluster of stars in the highly northern constellation of Cassiopeia. It was discovered by Charles Messier on 1774. It can be seen from Earth under a good night sky with binoculars. The brightness of the cluster is influenced by extinction, which is stronger in the southern half. Its metallicity is somewhat below that of the Sun, and is estimated to be [Fe/H] = −0.05 ± 0.01.

R. J. Trumpler classified the cluster appearance as II2r, indicating a rich cluster with little central concentration and a medium range in the brightness of the stars. This was later revised to I2r, denoting a dense core.

The magnitude 8.3 supergiant star BD +60°2532 is a probable member of the cluster, so too 18 candidate slowly pulsating B stars, one being a Delta (δ) Scuti variable, and three candidate Gamma Doradus (γ Dor) variables. There may also be three Be stars. The core of the cluster shows a lack of interstellar matter, which may be due to supernovae explosion(s) early in the cluster's history.

See also
 List of Messier objects

References and footnotes

External links
 
 Messier 52, SEDS Messier pages
 

Messier 052
Messier 052
052
Messier 052
Perseus Arm
?